The Winkie Country is the western region of the fictional Land of Oz in L. Frank Baum's classic series of Oz books, first introduced in The Wonderful Wizard of Oz (1900). The Winkie Country is in the West, noted by later being ruled by the Wicked Witch of the West.

This quadrant is strictly distinguished by the color yellow. This color is worn by most of the native inhabitants called the Winkies and predominates in the local surroundings. The Winkies are relatively normal in appearance with the exception of their yellow-tinted skin. Tin abounds there and it is said that the Winkies are some of the most skillful tinsmiths in the world. This was the country once ruled by the malevolent Wicked Witch of the West before Dorothy Gale "melted" her with a bucket of water, as narrated in The Wonderful Wizard of Oz. After that, the Winkies asked the Tin Woodman to be their new monarch ruler which he gladly accepted. He now lives in a vast palace made of tin that his loyal subjects built in his honor as a present for their new king.

The Classic Oz books
The publishing company Reilly & Britton (later Reilly & Lee) published, in the form of end-papers to the first edition of Tik-Tok of Oz (1914), the only authenticated map (reproduced here) that shows the Land of Oz in its entirety. For some undiscovered reason this map flip-flops the directions of east and west. The West and East subsection of the Wikipedia article on the Land of Oz discusses this error and the resulting contradictions.  The revised version of the map published by the International Wizard of Oz Club corrects the directions and reverses the map.  The map represents the entire area between the Winkie Country and the southern border of Oz as belonging to Quadling Country. The west country of Oz is bordered at the northeast by the Gillikin Country and to the south by the Quadling Country.

To the East lies the Emerald City and to the far east (beyond the Munchkin Country) as well as to the west, north and south (beyond the Quadling Country) of Winkie Country lies the Deadly Desert (which completely surrounds the Land of Oz). The Winkie Country is separated by the Deadly Desert from the underground Dominions of the Nome King. The Kingdom of Oogaboo, where items of value grow on trees, is separated from the Winkie Country by a mountain range. (Tik-Tok of Oz)

The Black Forest is in the southern part of the Winkie Country. Gloma, the good witch, rules there (The Wishing Horse of Oz).

In some of the Oz books by Ruth Plumly Thompson, the geography is inverted, with the Winkie Country in the Eastern part of Oz and the Munchkin Country in the West.

Political organization
The Winkie Country's many cities and kingdoms each have their own ruler, who in turn are subjects of the Tin Woodman, Nick Chopper, who himself acknowledges Ozma as supreme ruler of Oz.

Locations and inhabitants

Like all the countries of Oz, the Winkie Country contains various unusual sights, creatures, and places. Among them are:

 Wicked Witch of the West's Castle – This was where the Wicked Witch of the West ruled over the Winkies until she was melted by Dorothy.
 Tin Palace – A palace that is made out of tin. The Tin Woodman moved from the Wicked Witch of the West's castle because it was too damp.
 Jack Pumpkinhead's House – Jack Pumpkinhead lives in a giant hollowed-out pumpkin near the Tin Woodman's palace in Winkie Country.
 Scarecrow's Mansion – Jack designed a five story, jewel-encrusted mansion for the Scarecrow, shaped like an ear of corn.
 Bear Center – A forest where the stuffed bears live. They are ruled by the Lavender Bear and are guided by the mechanical Little Pink Bear.
 Bewilderness - A wild place where the rocks, shrubs, and trees change places making it difficult for anyone to travel through. It was seen in The Gnome King of Oz.
 Corabia - A kingdom along the northern edge of Winkie Country that is bordered by the Deadly Desert. Unlike Samandra, Corabia is a fertile land. The Sultan of Samandra once turned its inhabitants into fish until it was undone by Speedy and his friends.
 Corumbia - A kingdom along the northern edge of Winkie Country that is bordered by the Deadly Desert and is east of Samandra. The Sultan of Samandra once turned its inhabitants into plants and trees until it was undone by Speedy and his friends.
 Great Orchard – This lies between the Cities of Thi and Herku.
 Herku – A city ruled by Vig that has a strange master/slave society. It is square with gates of burnished copper in each of the four walls of the city. The residents of Herku use a small dose of Zosozo (a specially-compounded substance that is made of pure energy) that makes the residents skeletally thin and immensely strong enough to keep a breed of giants as their slaves.
 Marsh Land – A swampy location that is one muddy area. It is the home of the Sticks-in-the-Muds, a tribe of mud-covered people on stilts. Travelers are often told to evade Marsh Land.
 Merry-Go-Mountains – A bunch of mountains that whirl swiftly and are made of rubber.
 Monday Mountain - A steep mountain in Winkie Country which seems to be really a hill. Its inhabitants are an all-female race called the Tubbies who spend their days washing and cleaning while awaiting a man to come and marry their ruler Pearl Borax. Monday Mountain is surrounded by a rotating fence that would only stop if someone says "stop."
 Oogaboo – Oogaboo is located in the far northwestern corner of Winkie Country, within a mountain range that separates it from the rest of Winkie Country. It is ruled by Queen Ann Soforth, daughter and successor to King Jol Jemkiph Soforth, who abdicated. Oogaboo is one of the smallest and poorest kingdoms in the Land of Oz, despite the cultivation of trees which produce many items of value.
 Patch – A patchy-little kingdom south of Oogaboo. It is inhabited by the Quilties whose main occupation is the manufacture of patchwork quilts (The Gnome King of Oz).
 Perhaps City – A city that is on Maybe Mountain. It was seen in Grampa in Oz.
 Play - A fenced-off area in Winkie Country. Its people are called the Pierrettes and Pierots where they are ruled by King Capers and have a rough and tumble personality.
 Remote Tableland – A small community that is in the far southwestern corner of Winkie Country. It is home to the Yips who resemble the Hyups from Mount Munch in having no regular contact with the citizens of Oz below their plateau (as seen in The Lost Princess of Oz).
 Samandra - A dry desert-like kingdom that is at the far-northern edge of the Deadly Desert where slavery is practiced. Samandra is ruled by the Sultan of Samandra.
 Suds - A kingdom that is composed of soap and other bath-associated things.. It is ruled by Sultan Shampoozle and the inhabitants who are as big as a child don't like outsiders.
 Thi – A city that is a relatively unexplored part of Oz. It is surrounded by shifting fields that send a traveler in the opposite direction. The inhabitants of the city of Thi are called Thists. They have diamond-shaped heads and heart-shaped bodies. Their stomachs and throats are lined with gold allowing them to eat the thistles that grow around their city. They use mechanical dragons to pull their chariots.
 The Tottenhots – A race of small sprite-like people who sleep during the day and play at night that live in Winkie Country.
 Truth Pond – A pond that is located near the Deadly Desert. Anyone can bathe in and be freed of an enchantment, but must always afterward tell the truth.
 Tune Town - A kingdom surrounded by a wall that is ruled by Queen Jazzma. The wall contains a piano for a gate that must play to find the right chord to enter Tune Town. Normal talking and walking is not allowed except during intermission. To leave Tune Town, one must sing out of tune.
 Wackajammy – The breadbasket of the West. It was seen in Yankee in Oz.
 Wish Ways - A dusty road in different parts of Winkie Country where its dust can grant any wishes.

In film
The most famous depiction of the Winkies is in the 1939 musical film where they appear as the regimental army of the Wicked Witch of the West, marching in formation and chanting repeatedly. In the film, the Winkies bear little or no resemblance to their literary counterparts, dressing in blue uniforms based loosely on the uniforms of the Russian streltsy of some three and a half centuries earlier, and having green skin and pointed noses much like the Wicked Witch herself, and they are never referred to as Winkies in the film. The Winkie Country is only shown at night in the film, with the main colors being blue, black and gray. The scenery is very bleak and barren, with many mountains and rock formations.

In other works
In Gregory Maguire's revisionist Oz novels Wicked: The Life and Times of the Wicked Witch of the West and Son of a Witch, this area is called the Vinkus, and it is revealed that "Winkie" is considered a derogatory term.  The Vinkus is the largest of the four provinces, extending totally from south to north and standing on western Oz, this region is also almost completely isolated from the rest of the country, as it is bordered by deserts at north, west and south, and obstructed to the east by the Great and Lesser Kells mountains, being the only way in the Kumbricia's Pass, opened at certain times of the year, The Vinkus is the less populated and fertile land as well, being portrayed as a semi-desolated place with vast extenses of grasslands, mountains and deserts, there is only a poisonous lake, Kellswater, with oakhair forest, an oasis, by its side, the Vinkus River runs up to Kiamo Ko, home of the Tigelaar Family, leaders of the Arkiji Tribe and the only permanent settlement in the region. There are other places mentioned as well, such as Nether How, a group of diminute lakes, Applepress Farm, an abandoned warehouse formerly used by the maunts of Gillikin, The Thursk Desert, The Sour Sands, The Thousand Year Grasslands, a hunting place, Ugabu, disputed land in northern Vinkus and Kvon Altar, a strange place that is used as a sacred sanctuary by a dark occultist religión that is said to worship death, it is rumored that there are many underground water springs in the Vinkus.  

It is inhabited by several semi-nomadic tribes, including the Scrow, the Yunamata, and the Arjiki. 
 
Metallica sampled the chants of the Winkie guards outside the Wicked Witch's castle from The Wizard of Oz film on the intro to the track "The Frayed Ends of Sanity" on their 1988 album ...And Justice for All.  The chants were also heard in the Experience Unlimited song "Da Butt".

In the 1995 television special The Wizard of Oz in Concert: Dreams Come True which is based on the 1939 film, the Winkies appear without being dressed similar to Russian guards and holding pikes, but perform their chant until Dorothy melts the Wicked Witch (Debra Winger).

In West End's version of The Wizard of Oz musical, the marching music introduction and chant are both heard in the musical's first song, "Nobody Understands Me". It is performed by the Kansas farm workers Zeke, Hickory, and Hunk.

References

Fictional elements introduced in 1900
Oz countries